Sant Bhasha (ਸੰਤ-ਭਾਸ਼ਾ ; Sant Bhāṣā; meaning "language of saints") is a liturgical and scriptural language composed of vocabulary common to northern Indian languages, which was extensively used by saints and poets to compose religious verses. It can be understood by readers with a background in either Punjabi, Hindi-Urdu and its dialects.

Sant Bhasha is most prominently used in the central Sikh scripture, the Guru Granth Sahib. The languages used include Punjabi and its dialects, Lahnda, regional Prakrits, Apabhramsa, Sanskrit, Hindustani languages (Brajbhasha, Bangru, Awadhi, Old Hindi, Deccani, Bhojpuri), Sindhi, Marathi, Marwari and Persian. While vocabulary from all of these languages is used, Sant Bhasha is only written in the Gurmukhi script.

Sant Bhasha is notable for its high usage of inherited tadbhava vocabulary in-comparison to Sanskritic tatsama borrowings.

See also
 Sadhukadi
 Khalsa bole, coded language of Nihang Sikhs
 Sikh scriptures
 Guru Granth Sahib
 Dasam Granth
 Sarbloh Granth
 Sikh art and culture
 History of Sikhism

Notes

References 

Indo-Aryan languages
Languages of India
Sikh culture